This is a list of flags that are inscribed with written text. The flags are divided by language of the text.

Abkhaz

Afrikaans

Ambonese Malay

Amharic

Arabic

Armenian

Austral

Azerbaijani

Bashkir

Bislama

Belarusian

Bulgarian

Burmese

Buryat

Chechen

Chinese characters

Chuvash

Comorian

Crimean Tatar

Croatian

Czech

Dutch

English

Estonian

Fijian

Filipino (Tagalog)

Finnish

French

Georgian

German

Greek

Hebrew

Hungarian

Indonesian

Ingush

Island Carib

Italian

Japanese

Javanese

Kabardian

Kalmyk

Kamba

Karachay-Balkar

Karakalpak

Kawi

Kazakh

Khmer

Kinyarwanda

Korean

Kyrgyz

Latin

Latvian

Lithuanian

Macedonian

Malagasy

Malay

Maltese

Mari

Marshallese

Massachusett

Mongolian

Ndebele

Norwegian

Ossetian

Pashto

Polish

Portuguese

Rapa

Romanian

Romania

Moldova

Russian

Sakha

Sanskrit

Serbian

Sinhala

Slovak

Sotho

Spanish

Sundanese

Swahili

Tahitian

Tajik

Tamil

Ternate

Thai

Tigrinya

Tswana

Tuamotuan

Turkish

Turkmen

Tuvaluan

Tuvan

Udmurt

Ukrainian

Urdu

Uzbek

Vietnamese

Welsh

Notes